Luciano Giancarlo (13 April 1972, Morristown, New Jersey – 16 July 2007) was an American film and television actor of Italian descent.

Born as Luciano Giancarlo Guizzardi and raised in Bologna, Italy, Giancarlo appeared in such TV shows and films as Gypsy Rose, What I Like About You, Gilmore Girls, Will & Grace, Out of Practice and Arrested Development. He also did voice work for the video game Medal of Honor: Vanguard.

He died of pneumonia and cancer at age 35.

External links
IMDb

1972 births
2007 deaths
American male film actors
American male television actors
American male voice actors
Deaths from cancer in the United States
American people of Italian descent
Actors from Bologna
People from Morristown, New Jersey
Deaths from pneumonia in the United States
20th-century American male actors